West Jackson is an unincorporated community in Washington Township, Union County, Ohio, United States.

References 

Unincorporated communities in Union County, Ohio